John Reinhart (born 1981) is an American writer of speculative poetry and fiddle and guitar musician in the Texas style of fiddling. His poems have appeared in print and online publications internationally, including The Pedestal Magazine, Star*Line, Grievous Angel, Crannog Magazine, Focus, and the Songs of Eretz Poetry Review. He is a member of the Science Fiction Poetry Association.

Reinhart describes himself as an arsonist, which stems from his "hope to set fire to the imaginations and aspirations of (his) students,"  though he also says "he has encouraged his children to play with matches from an early age."

Education
A Denver native, Reinhart graduated from the Denver Waldorf High School before earning his BA from Hampshire College in Amherst, Massachusetts. Before returning to teach at the Waldorf School in Denver, Reinhart received his Master's Degree in education from Antioch University New England. After teaching at DWHS for 11 years, Reinhart moved to Maine, where he currently teaches humanities at the Maine Coast Waldorf School.

Writing career
Reinhart "burst on the speculative poetry scene", with his work appearing in a variety of speculative venues in 2014, winning the 2016 Dark Poetry Scholarship from the Horror Writers Association.

He served as a Frequent Contributor at the Songs of Eretz Poetry Review from January 2016 to December 2017. In addition to his writing, Reinhart edited issue 25 of Eye to the Telescope. He also served as the Science Fiction Poetry Association Annual Contest Chair in 2020. He served as the poetry judge for the Topsham, Maine Public Library Joy of the Pen Contest in 2020.

Reinhart's poem every, published by Quatrain.Fish was nominated for a Pushcart Prize in 2017. He has won the  weekly contest seven times, in weeks 46, 50, 55, 60, 64, 70, and 74. He has also received honorable mentions for his poetry in the 2019 Topsham Public Library Joy of the Pen Contest, and his nonfiction in the 2020 Topsham Public Library Joy of the Pen Contest.

Musical career
Reinhart collaborates with his brother, Patrick to form The Reinhart Brothers, a fiddle and tenor guitar duo that has released Satan Takes a Holiday...with The Reinhart Brothers, and FlimFlams in Your JimJams.

Reinhart studied fiddle under former national fiddle champion, Chris Daring, and is a former Colorado State Young Adult Fiddle Champion and multiple time Colorado State Rhythm Guitar Champion.

Bibliography
Horrific Punctuation. Arson Press, 2021 
Arson. NightBallet Press, 2018 
dig it. Arson Press, 2018 
screaming. Lion Tamer Press, 2017 
broken bottle of time. Alban Lake, 2017 
invert the helix. Pski's Porch, 2017 
Horrific Punctuation. Tiger's Eye Press, 2017
encircled Prolific Press, 2016

Discography
Redeemed by Four Strings
FlimFlams in Your JimJams

References

External links
John Reinhart's website
Washington Park Profile Article 'People of South Denver: John Reinhart, Denver Waldorf School teacher and poet'
Interview with Liminoid Magazine: 'The New Heart Will Rise'
Poet Interview: John Reinhart, with Colleen Anderson
Interview with Terrie Leigh Relf: A Day in the Life Presents: Collage Artist & Science Fiction, Speculative & Horror Poet, John Reinhart
Interview with Angela Yuriko Smith: 'John Reinhart: Arsonist Under an Ashtray'

Feature on the Colorado Poets Center

Maine Writers and Publishers Alliance Profile
Poets & Writers Profile
The Reinhart Brothers Pandora Channel

American science fiction writers
1981 births
Living people
21st-century American poets
American male poets
Date of birth missing (living people)
Place of birth missing (living people)
21st-century American male writers